Preuss or Preuß is a German surname derived from Preussen, the German word for Prussia, and may refer to:

 Charles Preuss (1803–1854), surveyor and cartographer on Fremont expeditions in the American West
 Christoph Preuß (born 1981), German football player
 Franziska Preuß (born 1994), German biathlete
 Hugo Preuß (1860–1925), German lawyer and liberal politician
 Josefine Preuß (born 1986), German actress
 Konrad Theodor Preuss (1869–1938), German ethnologist
 Paul Preuss (author) (born 1942), American science-fiction author and science consultant for film companies
 Paul Preuss (climber) (1886–1913), Austrian mountain climber
 Ted Preuss (born 1962), American fine art photographer

See also
 Preus (surname)
 Preuss's monkey, a diurnal primate
 The Preuss School UCSD, a coeducational college-preparatory charter day school established on the University of California, San Diego campus

German-language surnames
German toponymic surnames
Ethnonymic surnames